Damon Pierce is an American creator and owner of slavetobondage.com. In addition, he is a bondage rigger, BDSM educator, professional piercer, adult entertainment producer, and director from Los Angeles, California.

Presentations and teaching events
(2007) ShibariCon
(2010) Dark Odyssey Leather Retreat 
(2011) Fetish Flea Market 
(2013-2015) BoundCon Germany
(2013) Venus Fair Germany
(2011-2014) BOLDCon
(2014-2015-2016) Stockroom University 
(2016) Debauchery at Threshold
(2016) Fetish Con 
(2016) BoundCon Austria

Filmography
(2014) ROPE 
(2011) It Part Three
(2011) Mei I Please You?
(2010-2011) Infernal Restraints 
(2010) Hoisted
(2009) Hardtied
(2009) High Strung Women 
(2007-2009) Device Bondage 
(2007) House of Sex & Domination 
(2006) The Rebelle Rousers

Awards
2009 - AVN Award Winner – Best Best BDSM Release - House of Sex & Domination 
2009 - Ninfa Award Winner for Best BDSM Film - House of Sex & Domination

References

External links
Slave To Bondage website
Vintage Rope website
Monarchs website
Damon Pierce's Portfolio website

BDSM people
Educators from California
Fetish artists
Living people
Sex educators
Year of birth missing (living people)